Doubs is a department in the Bourgogne-Franche-Comté region in Eastern France. Named after the river Doubs, it had a population of 543,974 in 2019. Its prefecture is Besançon and subprefectures are Montbéliard and Pontarlier.

History

As early as the 13th century, inhabitants of the northern two-thirds of Doubs spoke Franc-Comtois, a dialect of the langues d'oïl. Residents of the southern third of Doubs spoke a dialect of the Arpitan language. Both languages co-existed with French, the official language of law and commerce, and continued to be spoken frequently in rural areas into the 20th century. They are both still spoken today but not on a daily basis.

Doubs was important as a portal to Switzerland through the pass at Cluse de Pontarlier. Many famous people, including Mirabeau, Toussaint Louverture and Heinrich von Kleist, were imprisoned in the Château de Joux.

Doubs is one of the original 83 departments created during the French Revolution on 4 March 1790. It was created from part of the former province of Franche-Comté. The prefecture (capital) is Besançon.

In 1793, the republic of Mandeure was annexed by France and incorporated into the department. This district was passed between various territories and departments in the ensuing administrative reorganisations and wars, but was restored to Doubs in 1816 when the former principality of Montbéliard was also added to the department.

However, the commune of Le Cerneux-Péquignot was annexed by the Canton of Neuchâtel under the terms of the 1814 Treaty of Paris, and since remained Swiss territory.

Between the defeat of France at the Battle of Waterloo and November 1818, Doubs was included in the area occupied by Austrian troops.

Victor Hugo, Gustave Courbet, Armand Peugeot, Auguste and Louis Lumière and Frank Darabont are among the famous people born in Doubs.

Geography
Doubs is part of the current region of Bourgogne-Franche-Comté and is surrounded by the French departments of Jura, Haute-Saône, and Territoire de Belfort, and the Swiss cantons of Vaud, Neuchâtel, and Jura.

The department is dominated by the Jura mountains, which rise east of Besançon.

Principal towns

The most populous commune is Besançon, the prefecture. As of 2019, there are 5 communes with more than 10,000 inhabitants:

Demographics
The inhabitants of the department are called Doubiens.

Population development since 1791:

Politics
The President of the Departmental Council is Christine Bouquin (DVD).

National Assembly Representatives

Economy
The Doubs department is at the same time the greenest and the most industrialized in France.

It is the birthplace of the automotive manufacturer Peugeot.

Tourism
The castle of Joux and Besançon are important tourist destinations.

Notable people
 

Paul-Claude Racamier (1924–1996), psychiatrist and psychoanalyst
Arnaud Courlet de Vregille (1958-), french painter

Gallery

See also
 Arrondissements of the Doubs department
 Cantons of the Doubs department
 Communes of the Doubs department

Bibliography

 Hoffmann, Michael, Die französischen Konservativen in der katholischen Provinz Parteigenese und politische Kultur im Doubs (1900–1930) (Frankfurt am Main u.a., Peter Lang, 2008) (Moderne Geschichte und Politik, 22).

References

External links
  Prefecture website
  Departmental Council website

 
1790 establishments in France
Departments of Bourgogne-Franche-Comté
States and territories established in 1790